This is a list of the equipment currently used by the Algerian Land Forces. It also contains equipment used by the Territorial Air Defence Forces, which is a separate service branch of the Algerian People's National Army tasked with the protection of the country's airspace.

Vehicles

Artillery

Light weapons

Small arms

Command and control

Drones

References

Algerian People's National Army
Military of Algeria
Military equipment of Algeria
Algeria